Ada River may refer to the following watercourses:

In Australia
 Ada River (Baw Baw, Victoria), a watercourse in the Shire of Baw Baw of Victoria
 Ada River (East Gippsland, Victoria), a tributary of the Bemm River in the Shire of East Gippsland of Victoria

In Italy
Adda (river), or Ada, a tributary of the Po in North Italy

In New Zealand
 Ada River (New Zealand), a tributary of the Waiau River in the South Island

See also
Adda River (disambiguation)